Stephen Wade Rathke (born 1948) is a community and labor activist who founded the Association of Community Organizations for Reform Now (ACORN) in 1970 and Service Employees International Union (SEIU) Local 100 in 1980 (now United Labor Unions Local 100).  He was ACORN's chief organizer from its founding in 1970 until June 2, 2008, and continues to organize for the international arm. He is the publisher and editor-in-chief of Social Policy, a quarterly magazine for scholars and activists.  The magazine's publishing arm has published four of his books.  He is also a radio station manager of KABF (Little Rock), WAMF (New Orleans), and WDSV (Greenville, Mississippi).

Early life and education
Rathke was born in Laramie, Wyoming, to Edmann J. Rathke and Cornelia Ratliff Rathke. He and his younger brother Dale were raised in Colorado and New Orleans, Louisiana, where they attended local schools and graduated from Benjamin Franklin High School.

Rathke attended Williams College, a private liberal arts college in Williamstown, Massachusetts, from 1966 to 1971. While there, Wade organized draft resistance for Students for a Democratic Society (SDS) and later organized welfare recipients in Springfield and Boston, Massachusetts for the National Welfare Rights Organization (NWRO).

ACORN

Founding
Rathke began his career as an organizer for the National Welfare Rights Organization (NWRO) in Springfield, Massachusetts. After working with the NWRO, he left for Little Rock, Arkansas to found a new organization designed to unite poor and working-class families around a common agenda.  As founder and chief organizer of ACORN, Rathke first hired Gary Delgado, among many notable community and labor organizers over the years. They developed a replicable model of "forming membership organizations and developing leaders in low-income neighborhoods -- relying substantially on young middle-class staff working for subsistence wages."

This community organizing initiative in Arkansas eventually developed as the Association of Community Organizations for Reform Now (ACORN), the largest organization of lower income and working families in the United States, with almost 500,000 dues-paying families spread across about one-hundred staffed offices in American cities. The Institute for Social Justice has been developed to serve as ACORN's training arm.

Departure
Wade Rathke resigned from ACORN on June 2, 2008, which is on the same day his brother Dale Rathke was fired for embezzlement. Wade Rathke however continued as the chief organizer of ACORN International.

SEIU Local 100
Rathke is also founder and Chief Organizer of Service Employees International Union (SEIU) Local 100, which is headquartered in New Orleans and also has chapters in Texas and Arkansas.  Founded in 1980 in New Orleans as an independent union of Hyatt employees, the union became part of SEIU in 1984. SEIU Local 100 organizes public sector public workers, including school employees, Head Start, and health care workers, as well as lower-wage private sector workers in the hospitality, janitorial, and other service industries.

Rathke's work in the labor movement includes three terms as Secretary-Treasurer of the Greater New Orleans AFL-CIO. Rathke was the president and co-founder of the SEIU Southern Conference; a member of the International Executive Board of SEIU (1996–2004); and Chief Organizer of the Hotel and Restaurant Organizing Committee (HOTROC) a multi-union organizing project for hospitality workers in New Orleans sponsored by the AFL-CIO and its president, John Sweeney, and from 2004–2008 chief organizer of a multi-pronged effort to organize Walmart workers, including the Walmart workers in Florida and California.  In 2009, Local 100 left SEIU and once again became United Labor Unions Local 100.

Rathke and Local 100 were most prominently in the news in the fall of 2017 when they filed charges with the NLRB to prevent Dallas Cowboys’ owner and general manager, Jerry Jones, from threatening his players if they refused to stand for the national anthem.  The union withdrew its charge after the NFL said it would not discipline players and Jones.

Other projects
In 2000, Rathke created the Organizers' Forum, which brings together senior organizers in labor and community organizations in dialogues about challenges faced by constituency-based organizations, such as tactical development, organizing new immigrants, using technology, using capital strategies and corporate campaign techniques, or understanding the effects and organizing challenges of globalization.

Radio
Since 2013, Rathke has returned to the 100,000-watt radio station KABF-FM 88.3 as its station manager.

Publications
Citizen Wealth: Winning the Campaign to Save Working Families (2009)  
The Battle for the Ninth Ward:  ACORN, Rebuilding New Orleans, and the Lessons of Disaster (2011) 
Edited Global Grassroots: Perspectives on International Organizing (2011)
Nuts and Bolts: The ACORN Fundamentals of Organizing (2018)

References

External links 
Chief Organizer Blog
ACORN International
ACORN
Tides Foundation
SEIU Local 100
Social Policy Magazine
WSJ Article about Rathke
Saul ... Time to Step Aside by Drummond Pike, June 25, 2008

American community activists
Trade unionists from Louisiana
Williams College alumni
1948 births
Living people
Activists from New Orleans
People from Laramie, Wyoming